Vehicle license plates of Switzerland, are composed of a two-letter code for the canton and a number with up to 6 digits. The rear plates also display two shields with the flags of Switzerland and the respective canton. 
Since 1972, the sizes of the plates have been 300 x 80 mm (front) and 300 x 160 mm (rear). In 1987, the optional long format rear plates of 500 x 110 mm, which had been abolished in 1972, were reintroduced.

The vehicle license number plates are assigned to the car owner and not to the vehicle. If the owner changes the vehicle, the same vehicle license number plates are attached to the new vehicle. The previous vehicle receives the vehicle license number plates of the new owner.
It is also possible to own two (or more) vehicles that share the vehicle license number plates: the plates are physically unmounted from one vehicle and mounted on another, provided the vehicles in question are owned by the same owner of the vehicle license number plate. These plates are known locally as "Wechselschilder".
In some cantons, when vehicle license number plates are returned and retired, they are made available again after a certain time.

Canton codes

Until 2020, vehicles in the Italian enclave of Campione d'Italia were registered in Ticino, but are now to be registered in the Italian town of Como.

Types

Diplomatic plates 

Swiss diplomatic plates display one of the prefixes "CD", "CC" or "AT", followed by a canton code, a serial number and a code for the country or organization. Low serial numbers are reserved for ambassadors or the head of an organization and their deputies.

 Official cars of the diplomatic missions.
 Motor vehicles of the members of the diplomatic staff of these missions .

 Vehicles of consular posts headed by a professional official.
 Motor vehicles of consular officials.

 Vehicles of permanent missions or other representations to intergovernmental organizations and motor vehicles for the members of the diplomatic staff of these missions.
 Vehicles of institutional beneficiaries such as intergovernmental organizations, international institutions, secretariats or other bodies set up under an international treaty, independent commissions, international courts, arbitral tribunals and other international bodies, who enjoy privileges, immunities and facilities, as well as the motor vehicles of the highest-ranking officials of these institutional beneficiaries, who enjoy diplomatic status in Switzerland.

 Vehicles belonging to members of the administrative and technical staff of diplomatic missions .

Codes

Obsolete types

Civilian Federal vehicles had registration plates composed of the Swiss shield followed by the letter "A" (short for "Administration") and a number with up to five digits. The first digit indicated the department. In 2004 these plates were replaced with normal cantonal plates.
A 1xxxx – Federal Department of Foreign Affairs
A 2xxxx – Federal Department of Home Affairs
A 3xxxx – Federal Department of Justice and Police
A 4xxxx – Federal Department of Defense, Civil Protection and Sport
A 5xxxx – Federal Department of Finance
A 6xxxx – Federal Department of Economy
A 7xxxx – Federal Department of Environment, Transport, Energy and Communication
 
The Post, Telegraph and Telephone company (PTT) and the Swiss Federal Railways (SBB) were part of the federal government until 1997/98. Their vehicles had registration plates composed of the Swiss coat followed by the letter "P" (short for "Post") and a number with up to five digits. When they became independent companies, the P-plates were replaced with cantonal plates in 2004.

P 1xxxx to P 7xxxx were attributed to PTT
P 8xxxx to P 9xxxx were attributed to SBB

References

External links
 

Switzerland
Road transport in Switzerland
Switzerland transport-related lists
 Registration plates